The term Old Syriac may refer to:

 Old Syriac language - an early stage of the Syriac language
 Old Syriac alphabet - an early stage of the Syriac alphabet
 Old Syriac Gospels - the Old Syriac version of the New Testament, that predates the standard Peshitta version, represented by two manuscripts:
 the Curetonian Gospels
 the Sinaitic Palimpsest

See also
 Syriac (disambiguation)